Tatiana C. Gfoeller (née Volkoff; born 1960) is a veteran United States diplomat. Since joining the Department of State in 1984, her foreign postings have included: Poland, Saudi Arabia, Bahrain, the Soviet Union, Belgium, Russia, and Turkmenistan. Gfoeller has served as a Deputy Chief of Mission in Turkmenistan, Deputy Principal Officer in Russia, and Consul General in Jeddah, Saudi Arabia. She was awarded the Rusk Fellowship in 2000. Additionally, Gfoeller authored a book on U.S. foreign policy interests in the Caspian Basin and has taught master's degree classes in political science at Georgetown University. She is a member of numerous foreign affairs organizations, including the Council on Foreign Relations and speaks Russian, French, Polish, Italian, Spanish, and Arabic. From 2011 to 2017, Gfoeller was a political adviser to the U.S. Joint Chiefs of Staff in the Pentagon. From October 22, 2008, to March 8, 2011, she served as Ambassador to the Kyrgyz Republic.
 Her father was the French writer of Russian extraction Vladimir Volkoff. Since January 2020, Gfoeller has been the President of AWIU (American Women for International Understanding), a global women's rights NGO.

Her husband is Ambassador Michael Gfoeller. They have one son, Cpt. Emmanuel Gfoeller, an Army Ranger.

References

Further reading

 Interview http://bishkek.usembassy.gov/pr101510.html

1960 births
Living people
American women ambassadors
Ambassadors of the United States
Ambassadors of the United States to Kyrgyzstan
21st-century American women